White Rock (Navajo:) is a  Navajo settlement (hamlet) in San Juan County, New Mexico, United States. It is named after a cliff exposure to the northeast of the settlement. The settlement is also a chapter of the Shiprock Agency of the Navajo Nation.

Footnotes

External links
 "Map of Navajo Country" with list of settlements, landmarks, water features, parks and forests, by Harrison Lapahie Jr.
 Tséłgaii Chapter

Unincorporated communities in San Juan County, New Mexico
Unincorporated communities in New Mexico
Populated places on the Navajo Nation